Shahed University (Persian: دانشگاه شاهد) is a public university in Tehran, Iran. The campus is located in the southern part of Tehran along the Persian Gulf Freeway. Founded in 1990, the university started its activities by accepting 165 students in seven branches in 1991. It now has 10000 students in 100 programs, 8 faculty, and 7 research institutions.

Campus and student life
The campus hosts headquarters offices, women's dormitories, a central library and faculties of humanities, engineering, sciences and agriculture. Its medical colleges and training hospitals, the Art college, the Nursing and Midwifery Faculty, the Dental college and research centers are in the Central Tehran.

Shahed University offers three dormitories and is equipped with a pool, a football field, and a volleyball and basketball hall. Each faculty offers its own library, plus a central library near the Humanities and Management College. Students can enjoy their free time at the cafeteria near the Engineering college, separated for males and females. A Mahdie (Prayer Center) is available to both genders and is open at all times.

Mostafa Khomeini Hospital (in the city center) is under Shahed university supervision (Faculty of Medicine).

Ranking
Shahed University world rank is 741 in 2020 by SCImago Institutions Rankings and was 2160 in 2016 by Webometrics.

Colleges
 College of Agriculture
 College of Engineering
 College of Fundamental Sciences
 College of Human Sciences
 College of Medicine
 College of Dentistry
 College of Art
 College of Nursing and Midwifery

College of Human Sciences 

The Faculty of Humanities was established in 1990 and currently has 85 full-time faculty members and 21 staff in 15 departments (12 specialized departments and 3 general departments) in 12 undergraduate and 12 graduate courses.  And trains students in three specialized doctoral programs.  The development of college disciplines in graduate school is one of the ongoing programs.

Among the features and facilities of the faculty, the following can be mentioned:

The largest university faculty in terms of educational space, Having the most university students, Most accepted in the master's degree, Most academic disciplines, Providing educational services for general courses (English language, Persian literature, physical education and Islamic education) to all faculties, Having Daneshvar specialized scientific research journal in three fields of psychology;  Management and educational sciences, Foreign language laboratory, Clinical Psychology Laboratory, Laboratory of Physical Education and Sports Science, Audio and visual, Library Workshop, Proximity to the central library and the central information site of the university, Proximity to bookstores and publications (printing and duplication), website, computer workshop.

College of Agricultural Sciences

The College of Agriculture Science at Shahed University ranks in the top best three colleges of agriculture in Iran. A field is dedicated for the students to experiment on; each student gets a piece of land to work on and is graded in theoretical and practical aspects.

 Majors offered for Bachelor students (BSc): Soil Science - Horticultural Science - Agronomy and Plant Science - Medical Plant Science
 Majors offered for Master students (MSc): Pedology - Soil chemical Science - Soil Physics Science - Entomology - Plant Disease Science

College of Engineering
Every year research papers including ISI journals are published by talented students and professors. Many graduates of this college have opportunities to continue their education in high level universities in developed countries.

 Biomedical Engineering (up to PhD) 
 Electrical Engineering (four majors: Electronic, Communications and Power (all up to PhD) and Control (up to Msc) 
 Civil Engineering (Bsc and Geotechnical Engineering (MSc) and Structure Engineering (MSc))
 Industrial Engineering (MSc and PhD)
 Computer Engineering and Information Technology (MSc)

College of Engineering events
 14th Iranian Conference on Biomedical Engineering
 16th Iranian Conference on Electrical Engineering

Engineering Research and Technology Center
Shahed University has a center for engineering research and technology in Enghelab square in Tehran. It includes groups such as biomedical group, communication group and mechanical group.

College of Fundamental Sciences
Department of Biology at Shahed University has the top place in biology in Iran and has recently been recognized as a privileged group in the country. The founder of biotechnology from the undergraduate degree to Ph.D. in the country was the Department of Biology at Shahed University.

College of Medicine
Shahed University College of Dentistry  is at Karegare Shomali Nosrat Avenue no 115 in Tehran.  Shahed University College of Medicine is located in the main campus (which is among top 3 largest campus in Tehran) at the turn of this century,  has opened a new chapter in the University's architectural designs. The medical centers, educational and medical Mostafa Khomeini is a hospital in central Tehran. Mostafa Khomeini hospital has 220 beds and is under the supervision of the Medical School of Shahed University.

Publications

English journals

 International Panacea Journal of Engineering and Technology
 Journal of Basic & Clinical Psychopathology
 Journal of Communication Engineering
 Journal of Electric Power & Energy Conversion Systems
 Journal of Quality Engineering and Production Optimization

Persian journals
 دانشور پزشكي Scope: Medicinal Sciences 
 روانشناسی بالینی و شخصیت Scope: Clinical Psychology & Personality
 راهبردهای بازرگانی Scope: Commercial Strategies
 مطالعات اسلام Scope: Islam Related Studies پژوهش نامه علم سنجی Scope: Educational Progress Rating
 اخلاق و فرهنگ در پرستاری و مامائی Accepts papers in English as wellScope: Ethics & Culture in Nursing and Midwiferyدانش زراعت Scope: Agronomy Sciencesپژوهش های آموزش و یادگیری Scope: Training and Learning Researches
 نگاره Accepts papers in English as well Scope: Art
 ادبیات مقاومت'' Scope: Resistance Literature

References

External links
Official website

 
1990 establishments in Iran
Educational institutions established in 1990